Crowborough Country Park is a   Local Nature Reserve on the western outskirts of Crowborough in East Sussex. It is owned and managed by Crowborough Town Council.

The park has diverse habitats including wet and dry woodland, grass and heath glades, marshes, streams and ponds. The main stream runs through a steep rocky gorge. Flora include the nationally rare moss Discelium nudum.

There is access at a number of points including in Osborne Road and Tollwood Road.

References

Local Nature Reserves in East Sussex
Crowborough